The 1952 Tennessee Volunteers (variously Tennessee, UT, or the Vols) represented the University of Tennessee in the 1952 college football season. Playing as a member of the Southeastern Conference (SEC), the team was led by head coach Robert Neyland, in his 21st and final year, and played their home games at Shields–Watkins Field in Knoxville, Tennessee. They finished the season with a record of eight wins, two losses and one tie (8–2–1 overall, 5–0–1 in the SEC). They concluded the season with a loss against Texas in the Cotton Bowl Classic.

Schedule

Team players drafted into the NFL

References

Tennessee
Tennessee Volunteers football seasons
Tennessee Volunteers football